Han Mi-seul (born 13 August 1993) is a South Korean handball player for Wonderful Samcheok and the South Korean national team.

She competed at the 2015 World Women's Handball Championship in Denmark.

References

1993 births
Living people
South Korean female handball players
Handball players at the 2018 Asian Games
Asian Games gold medalists for South Korea
Asian Games medalists in handball
Medalists at the 2018 Asian Games
Universiade medalists in handball
Universiade silver medalists for South Korea
Medalists at the 2015 Summer Universiade